The Polk County Courthouse is a historic building in Benton, Tennessee. It serves as the courthouse for Polk County, Tennessee.

Three courthouses were built for Polk County before this one. The first one was built in 1840, the second one in 1851, the third one in 1897. The fourth and current courthouse was built in 1937.

The building was designed in the Art Deco architectural style by R. H. Hunt & Co. It has been listed on the National Register of Historic Places since June 24, 1993.

References

External links

National Register of Historic Places in Polk County, Tennessee
Art Deco architecture in Tennessee
Government buildings completed in 1937
Courthouses on the National Register of Historic Places in Tennessee
County courthouses in Tennessee
1937 establishments in Tennessee